Percy Hooper (17 December 1914 – July 1997) was an English professional footballer who played for Northfleet United, Tottenham Hotspur, Swansea Town, and King's Lynn.

Percy Hooper was a goalkeeper who played for Tottenham Hotspur between 1934 and 1939 making 108 appearances (97 league and 11 F.A. Cup) for the club. During the period of the Second World War, he guested for several teams. In the 1946/7 season he played for Swansea on 12 occasions. In 1948 he moved on to Chingford Town before ending his playing career at King's Lynn.

References 

1914 births
1997 deaths
Footballers from Lambeth
English footballers
Association football goalkeepers
Swansea City A.F.C. players
Tottenham Hotspur F.C. players
Chingford Town F.C. players
King's Lynn F.C. players
English Football League players